Jennifer D. Keene is an American historian who specializes in World War I.

Education 
Keene attended George Washington University, where she earned a Bachelor of Arts degree and a Masters of Arts degree.  She attended Carnegie Mellon University for her PhD.

Career 
Keene is the chair of the history department at Chapman University.

Selected publications 
The United States and the First World War (2000)
First World War: Doughboys, the Great War and the Remaking of America Johns Hopkins University Press, 2001. 
World War I: The American Soldier Experience University of Nebraska Press, 2011. 
United States and the First World War. Routledge, 2016.

References

External links

Year of birth missing (living people)
Living people
21st-century American historians
Historians of World War I
Columbian College of Arts and Sciences alumni
Carnegie Mellon University alumni
Chapman University faculty